Alexander Lebedev is a Russian oligarch, owner of various British newspapers. Alexander Lebedev may also refer to:

 Aleksandr Lebedev (biochemist) (1869–1937), Russian biochemist
 Alexander Lebedev (figure skater) (born 2002), Russian-Belarusian figure skater
 Aleksandr Lebedev (footballer) (born 1981), Russian footballer
 Aleksandr Lebedev (rower) (born 1984), Russian rower
 Aleksandr Lebedev (speed skater) (born 1987), Russian Olympic speed skater
 Alyaksandr Lebedzew (born 1985), Belarusian footballer, plays for FC Dinamo Minsk
 Aleksandr Lebedev-Frontov (1960–2022), Russian painter, collagist, and musician
 Alexei Lebedev (1924-1993), Russian composer